Edward Leroy Wheeler (June 15, 1878 in Sherman, Michigan – August 15, 1960 in Ft. Worth, Texas) was a professional baseball player who was a utility player for the Brooklyn Superbas during the 1902 season. He played 11 games at third base, 10 games at second base and 5 games at short stop for the Superbas that season.

External links

1878 births
1960 deaths
Major League Baseball infielders
Brooklyn Superbas players
Baseball players from Michigan
Minor league baseball managers
Grand Rapids Cabinet Makers players
Toledo Mud Hens players
Binghamton Bingoes players
Worcester Farmers players
Dayton Veterans players
Detroit Tigers (Western League) players
Colorado Springs Millionaires players
Dayton Old Soldiers players
Columbus Senators players
St. Paul Saints (AA) players
Denver Grizzlies (baseball) players
Memphis Turtles players
Minneapolis Millers (baseball) players
South Bend Bronchos players
Grand Rapids Furniture Makers players
Newark Newks players
South Bend Benders players
Grand Rapids Grads players
Terre Haute Miners players
Beaumont Oilers players
Springfield Watchmakers players
Grand Forks Flickertails players
Flint Vehicles players